The Nordic Folkboat Gold Cup is a sailing race in Nordic Folkboat held annually in Sweden, Denmark, Finland, or Germany. The cup is subject for competition between yacht clubs competed in regular fleet racing style with individual crew. If any yacht club manages to win the cup for six times, the club wins it to keep it forever. It has been conquered forever three times, by Kjøbenhavns Amatør-Sejlklub in 1974 and by Kerteminde Sejlklub in 1982 and 1994. Luckily both yacht clubs have donated the cup back to continue the tradition of the prestigious cup. With the lack of a World Championships, the Gold Cup is the most prestigious event in the class.

The yacht club with the most inscriptions is Kerteminde Sejlklub, with 17, and most individual wins have Danish Erik Andreasen, with 6. Danish crew have won 42 times, German crew have won 9 times, and Swedish crew have won once. The highest number of participants was in 1984, when 96 crew participated (of which eight from the United States).

The upcoming editions will be held in Warnemünde in 2015, Helsinki 2016, Kerteminde 2017.

History 
The first cup was set up 1963 by the senator Alfred Hagelstein of Lübeck. In the beginning races were held in Lübeck-Trawemünde area or in Denmark and the first yacht club to reach six wins would keep the cup.

In 1978 the first race was held in Sweden, and in 2016 the first race will be held in Finland.

Editions

Winning yacht clubs

See also 
 Gold Cup

References 

Sailing competitions
Yachting races
Recurring sporting events established in 1963